From November 9–12, 2016, protests occurred in Oakland, California, against the election of Donald Trump. While originally peaceful, these protests became violent, with protesters lighting trash cans and cars and a building on fire and smashing store windows and throwing bottles at police. Thirty protesters were arrested, and three officers were injured.

Riots
Shocked and angered at the election results, students marched out of Berkeley and into Oakland in the early morning hours of November 9. As they marched into Oakland, more people joined the protest. The protesters blocked roads and lit several trash cans and newspaper boxes on fire in the middle of the streets. Protesters vandalized cars and burned American flags for hours in Oakland.

On the night of November 9, protesters returned to downtown Oakland to express anger over the election of Donald Trump. While the protest began peaceful, it descended into violence later that night. Protesters lit bonfires in the street, set dumpsters and garbage cans on fire and clashed with riot police throughout the night. A police cruiser was also set ablaze by angry demonstrators in downtown.

On November 11, several hundred protesters blocked a freeway in Oakland for an hour.

Aftermath
Overall, 30 people were arrested and eleven were issued citations. Three police officers were injured.

Other than the Oakland Police Department, twelve law enforcement agencies were involved. Authorities stated that there were 16 reports of vandalism against businesses in Oakland over two nights, and a vandalism incident in which the three Pleasanton Police Department SUVs had their windows smashed and were defaced by graffiti.

See also
 International reactions to the 2016 United States presidential election
 2016 Portland, Oregon riots
 
 Protests against Donald Trump
 List of riots
 List of incidents of civil unrest in the United States

References

2016 crimes in California
2016 riots
Riots
November 2016 crimes in the United States
Political riots in the United States
Protests against Donald Trump
Protests against results of elections
Riots and civil disorder in California
Student riots